Joseph Cotton (born 1957) is a reggae DJ.

Joseph or Joe Cotton may also refer to:

Joseph Cotton (mariner) (1746–1825), English mariner and merchant
Joseph P. Cotton (1875–1931), Under Secretary of State under Herbert Hoover from 1929 to 1931
Joe Cotton (born 1978), Canadian-born New Zealand female pop singer
Joe Cotton (horse), an American Thoroughbred racehorse
Joseph F. Cotton (1922–2016), U.S. Air Force test pilot
Joseph R. Cotton (1890–1983), American jurist and politician in Massachusetts
Joe Cotton (rugby union) (born 1999), Australian rugby union player

See also
Joseph Cotten (1905–1994), American actor
Joseph Cotton Wigram